"Long Way Down" is a song by American musician Robert DeLong. It was released as the lead single from his second studio album In the Cards (2015). An EP accompanying the release of the single was released on November 10, 2014. The song reached number 3 on the Billboard Alternative Songs chart.

Release
"Long Way Down" was released as an EP on November 10, 2014, featuring three other tracks. The song was also released in the UK as a promotional CD single. A translucent yellow 12" vinyl version of the EP was made available to attendees on his tour and for purchase, as well.

Track listing
Glassnote – Promotional CD

Glassnote – Digital download and 12" vinyl EP

Charts

Weekly charts

Year-end charts

References

External links
 .

2014 singles
2014 songs
Glassnote Records singles
Songs written by Emanuel Kiriakou
Songs written by Andrew Goldstein (musician)
Songs written by E. Kidd Bogart